Tom Vannoppen (born 21 December 1978 in Ham) is a Belgian former cyclist.

References

External links

1978 births
Living people
Belgian male cyclists
People from Ham, Belgium
Cyclo-cross cyclists
Cyclists from Limburg (Belgium)